Dysgonia albocincta is a moth of the family Noctuidae first described by Francis Walker in 1865. It is found in Indonesia.

References

Dysgonia